Mymensingh Engineering College, commonly referred to as MEC, is a fully public undergraduate engineering college in Mymensingh Division, Bangladesh, and was established in 2009. Mymensingh Engineering College is an elite institution for graduating in engineering disciplines in Bangladesh and is affiliated with the University of Dhaka. It offers students the latest fields of engineering education in Bangladesh. Every year, around 180 students get accepted to undergraduate programs in Electrical & Electronic Engineering (EEE), Civil Engineering (CE) and Computer Science Engineering (CSE).

History
In January 2004, then Finance Minister M. Saifur Rahman approved the creation of Mymensingh Engineering College and Sylhet Engineering College. On 9 May 2006, a budget of ৳56 crore was proposed for Mymensingh Engineering College project in the meeting of the Executive Committee of National Economic Council (ECNEC). The two Engineering College project works continued from July 2004 to June 2007. After this time it was handed over to the Ministry of Education. During the revised Budget fixation for Sylhet Engineering College, the Minister hinted about a plan to merge these two colleges into an engineering university.
The college was inaugurated by Former Minister Motiur Rahman on 4 July 2009.
After that, a project of ৳27cr was taken in hand for development of Mymensingh Engineering College.
The project was fully completed in 2011.

The administration admitted 60 students (by admission test) into Electrical and Electronic Engineering Department on 4 July 2009. In Session 2008–2009, EEE department was introduced as the 1st batch of Mymensingh Engineering College. In the 2014-15 Session, the CE department was introduced. Now three departments are running in a full swing.

There is a hope that in future  it will be upgraded into full-fledged Public Engineering University called Mymensingh University of Engineering & Technology (MUET).

Academics

Affiliation
Mymensingh Engineering College is affiliated with University of Dhaka under the Faculty of Engineering & Technology

Departments 
Department of Electrical and Electronic Engineering (EEE)
Department of Civil Engineering (CE)
Department of Computer Science & Engineering (CSE)

Undergraduate Courses

Undergraduate Admission  
The Undergraduate Admission process is controlled by University of Dhaka. And this admission process controlled under DU Technology Unit.

Campus

Every building is accommodated in a multi-storied building over an area of about  land. There are 13 buildings including an administrative building and faculty buildings. There are also quarters for teachers and staff.

The central library is within walking distance from the academic buildings and student residences. It is in a compact building with limited built-in facilities to provide teaching aids such as a reading facility, book lending, journals, etc. to the students and teachers of Mymensingh Engineering College. Consistent with the academic curricula, the contents of the central library are updated consistently to keep up with technological trends. Besides online facility is available in the central library. A large number of engineering books available in this modern library.

The college has an Auditorium Complex having a seating capacity of about 200 which is capable of holding conferences, seminars, and other cultural programs. Besides this, there are a seminar and conference rooms with limited capacity in engineering degree awarding departments.

Lab facilities

Department of Electrical and Electronic Engineering (EEE) 
 Electronics Lab
 Electrical Circuit Lab
 Electrical Machine Lab
 Power System & High voltage Lab
 Digital Signal Processing Lab
 Structural Machine Lab

Department of Computer Science and Engineering(CSE) 
 Networking Lab
 Communication & Microprocessor Lab
 Central Computer Center Lab
 Computer Lab
 Microprocessor Lab
 Software Lab
 ACM Lab
 Digital Logic Design Lab
 ATTS Lab

Department of Civil Engineering (CE) 
 Transportation Lab
 Drawing Lab
 Hydraulics Lab
 Environment Lab
 Geo-Technical Lab
 Physics Lab
 Chemistry Lab
 Machine Shop
 Welding Shop
 Surveying Shop
 Foundry Shop
 Wood Shop
 Language Lab
 AutoCAD Lab
 Structural Engineering Lab

Research areas 
    
Power System
Nano Electronics
Communication & Networking System 
Digital Signal Processing (DSP)
Artificial Intelligence
Smart Grid 
Renewable Energy
Power Electronics
Solar Energy
Biomedical Optics
Data Science
Machine Learning

Research Lab 
Alpha Science Lab
Recently ASL made a great revolution in rocket science in Bangladesh. They already made few rockets first time ever in Bangladesh. They will launch it very soon upon the government approval.

Scholarship Opportunities  
In every semester government would give stipend on the basis of CGPA (Top 50% in per batch or department).

MEC Alumni 

More than 700 engineers have completed their graduation from MEC and now they are employed in various sectors of Bangladesh like BREB, DPDC, DESCO, PGCB, NESCO, DMTCL, RPCL, BSTI, Rooppur Nuclear Power Plant, Bank, Walton etc.  Recently some alumni got recommended as BCS cadre from BPSC. They have also been appointed as Lecturers/Assistant Professors in reputed public and private universities of Bangladesh. Besides, many students are now pursuing higher education in abroad by getting world's one of the most prestigious Erasmus Mundus Scholarship. As a new Engineering College, they got the opportunity to study in world's famous engineering university as like the University of Texas, Boston University, McGill University, Karlsruhe Institute of Technology (KIT), Concordia University,University of Calgary, Korea Institute of Science & Technology (KIST), Tampere University, University of York,  Aix-Marseille University, University of Eastern Finland, Jean Monnet University, University of Siegen, Shanghai University of Technology, Moscow Power Engineering Institute, University of Applied Science Upper Austria , with full scholarships. Not only these universities but also other university too. Moreover, many students are now pursuing their master’s degree at BUET, KUET,RUET, CUET, DUET, DU, MIST, JU, JNU, BUP, BSMRAAU in Bangladesh.

References

External links
http://www.mec.ac.bd
https://admission.eis.du.ac.bd/index.php?act=login/index
https://collegeadmission.eis.du.ac.bd
https://admission.eis.du.ac.bd/index.php?act=information/get_notices/tec
https://web.archive.org/web/20150224170926/http://admission.eis.du.ac.bd/

Universities and colleges in Bangladesh
Educational institutions established in 2007
Engineering universities and colleges in Bangladesh
2007 establishments in Bangladesh
Education in Mymensingh